Manipur State Congress Party (MSCP) is a former political party in the Indian state of Manipur. The party was founded in 1997 by Wahengbam Nipamacha as a split from the Indian National Congress (INC). In 2014 the MCSP remerged with the INC.

History 

The party was formed after a group of ministers and legislators, led by former Speaker Nipamacha, broke away from the ruling Indian National Congress and floated the Party which subsequently formed the next government. "Cultivator Cutting Crop" is the election symbol of the party. Nipamacha then became the chief minister of a coalition government led by the party. In the 1999 Lok Sabha elections, then-MSCP candidate Th. Chaoba Singh got elected and became Union Minister of State for Food Processing during Atal Behari Vajpayee's tenure.

In February 2001, 22 members of the MSCP formed an alliance with Samta Party to form a government led by Radhabinod Koijam.

Merged with INC

The Manipur State Congress Party (MSCP) merged back with the Indian National Congress with its five party MLAs on 4 April 2014. The last party president was Y. Mani Singh. It was de-recognised by Election Commission of India in June 2015.

Elections
In 2002 Legislative Assembly elections in Manipur, Party had contested on 42 out of 60 seats and had won seven seats, and five of them joined the Congress. In 2007 Assembly elections, party had contested on 6 seats but failed to win any seats.

See also 
 Manipur National Conference

References

Indian National Congress breakaway groups
Political parties in Manipur
Political parties established in 1997
1997 establishments in Manipur
Recognised state political parties in India